Taylor County is a county located in the Big Bend region in the northern part of the U.S. state of Florida. As of the 2020 census, the population was 21,796. Its county seat is Perry.  The county hosts the annual Florida Forest Festival and has been long known as the "Tree Capital of the South" since a 1965 designation from then-Governor W. Haydon Burns.

History
Taylor County was created on December 23 1856 from Madison County. It was named for Zachary Taylor, twelfth President of the United States of America, who served from 1849 to 1850. Taylor won most counties in northern Florida during the election of 1848 and was largely responsible for the ultimate U.S. victory in the Second Seminole War.

During the American Civil War, Taylor County was home to William Strickland and his band of deserters and Unionists called "The Royal Rangers." In 1864, a Confederate colonel tasked with hunting down deserters, broke into Strickland's home and found a membership list of 35 men who "bear true allegiance to the United States of America." Despite their names being identified and homes burned to the ground, few members of the Royal Rangers surrendered.

Geography

Adjacent counties
 Jefferson County, Florida - northwest
 Madison County, Florida - north
 Lafayette County, Florida - east
 Dixie County, Florida - southeast

National protected area
 St. Marks National Wildlife Refuge (part)

Demographics

2020 census
Note: the US Census treats Hispanic/Latino as an ethnic category. This table excludes Latinos from the racial categories and assigns them to a separate category. Hispanics/Latinos can be of any race.

As of the 2020 United States census, there were 21,796 people, 7,405 households, and 5,197 families residing in the county.

2000 census
As of the census of 2000, there were 19,256 people, 7,176 households, and 5,130 families residing in the county.  The population density was 18 people per square mile (7/km2).  There were 9,646 housing units at an average density of 9 per square mile (4/km2).  The racial makeup of the county was 77.84% White, 19.04% Black or African American, 0.98% Native American, 0.44% Asian, 0.02% Pacific Islander, 0.32% from other races, and 1.38% from two or more races.  1.53% of the population were Hispanic or Latino of any race.

There were 7,176 households, out of which 31.60% had children under the age of 18 living with them, 52.50% were married couples living together, 14.40% had a female householder with no husband present, and 28.50% were non-families. 24.20% of all households were made up of individuals, and 10.60% had someone living alone who was 65 years of age or older.  The average household size was 2.51 and the average family size was 2.95.

In the county, the population was spread out, with 24.60% under the age of 18, 8.20% from 18 to 24, 28.30% from 25 to 44, 24.80% from 45 to 64, and 14.10% who were 65 years of age or older.  The median age was 38 years. For every 100 females there were 104.40 males.  For every 100 females age 18 and over, there were 104.80 males.

The median income for a household in the county was $30,032, and the median income for a family was $35,061. Males had a median income of $27,967 versus $19,054 for females. The per capita income for the county was $15,281.  About 14.50% of families and 18.00% of the population were below the poverty line, including 22.20% of those under age 18 and 17.90% of those age 65 or over.

In March 2016, the county's unemployment rate was 5.6%.

Education
Students are served by the Taylor County School System.  For the 2006 - 2007 school year the Florida Department of Education gave the District a "B" grade with three of its schools earning an "A" and one school earning a "B" grade.

Taylor County High School also has an Army JROTC unit which has been an Honor Unit with Distinction for 27 consecutive years.

Library
The Taylor County Public Library is part of the Three Rivers Library System, which also serves Gilchrist, Lafayette, and Dixie counties.

Communities

Town
 Perry

Census-designated place
 Steinhatchee

Other unincorporated communities

 Athena
 Bucell Junction
 Clara (shared with Dixie County)
 Dekle Beach
 Eridu
 Fenholloway
 Fish Creek
 Foley
 Hampton Springs
 Iddo
 Keaton Beach
 Lake Bird
 Pinland
 Salem
 Shady Grove
 Tennille

Politics

Transportation

Airports
 Perry–Foley Airport

Major highways

  U.S. Highway 19
  U.S. Highway 27
 
  U.S. Highway 98
  U.S. Highway 221
  State Road 51

See also
 National Register of Historic Places listings in Taylor County, Florida

References

External links

Government links/Constitutional offices
 Taylor County Board of County Commissioners
 Taylor County Supervisor of Elections
 Taylor County Property Appraiser
 Taylor County Sheriff's Office
 Taylor County Tax Collector
 Taylor County Public Library

Special districts
 Taylor County Schools District
 Suwannee River Water Management District

Judicial branch
 Taylor County Clerk of Courts
  Public Defender, 3rd Judicial Circuit of Florida serving Columbia, Dixie, Hamilton, Lafayette, Madison, Suwannee, and Taylor Counties
  Office of the State Attorney, 3rd Judicial Circuit of Florida
  Circuit and County Court for the 3rd Judicial Circuit of Florida

Tourism links
 Taylor County Tourism Development Council

 
Florida counties
1856 establishments in Florida
North Florida
Populated places established in 1856